James Lloyd Logsdon (April 1, 1922 – October 7, 2001) was an American country and rockabilly singer, songwriter and radio DJ. He performed country music as Jimmie (or Jimmy) Logsdon, and rockabilly music, including his best-known song "I Got a Rocket in My Pocket," as Jimmy Lloyd.

Life and career
Logsdon was born in Panther, Kentucky, the son of a Methodist minister. He and his sister sang in choirs and took part in local talent contests, and he grew up listening to rhythm and blues as well as country music. He graduated from high school in Ludlow, Kentucky, in 1940, and married the same year, before starting work installing PA systems in nearby Cincinnati. He joined the Air Corps in 1944, and on leaving two years later opened a record and radio shop in La Grange, Kentucky. He learned the guitar, and began writing songs, performing regularly on radio station WLOU and in clubs as leader of a country trio. He made his first recordings for the local Harvest label in Cincinnati in 1951, and the following year joined station WKYW as senior announcer. He continued performing, and at a show in Louisville met his hero Hank Williams, who encouraged him to seek a recording deal.

He made his first recordings for Decca Records in Nashville, including "I Wanna Be Mama'd", in October 1952. Following Williams' death three months later, Logsdon recorded a tribute to him, "Hank Williams Sings the Blues No More", but it failed to reach the country charts. Later in 1953, Logsdon joined station WHAS-TV, and hosted and performed, with his band the Golden Harvest Boys, on its country music show. He continued to record for Decca, but his records had little success and he left the label in 1955. He also recorded for the Starday and Dot labels. He maintained a radio show on station WKLO, and interviewed many leading country performers, as well as Elvis Presley.

In 1957 he recorded a rockabilly song, "Rio de Rosa", which he had co-written with Vic McAlpin, for Roulette Records. It failed to sell, but the song was quickly covered by Carl Perkins. For his next recording for Roulette, "I Got a Rocket in My Pocket", also co-written with McAlpin, he used the pseudonym Jimmy Lloyd, recognising that country fans did not appreciate him singing rock and roll, particularly a song with lyrics of which some disapproved. Few listeners realised at the time that the recording was by Logsdon.

After leaving Roulette, Logsdon continued working as a DJ, at WCKY in Cincinnati, and appeared on national radio shows. He made some further recordings for King Records in Cincinnati in 1963, before moving to work for other radio stations in Kentucky and Alabama later in the 1960s. He also wrote songs for Johnny Horton and others. He made no recordings after 1973, but sang occasionally in clubs, and worked for a swimming pool business and in the Kentucky Labor Department.

He died in Louisville in 2001, aged 79.

References

External links
 
 

1922 births
2001 deaths
American country singer-songwriters
American country rock singers
American rockabilly musicians
American radio personalities
Country musicians from Kentucky
People from Daviess County, Kentucky
Rock musicians from Kentucky
Singer-songwriters from Kentucky
20th-century American singers